Westlake is a city and the 39th municipality in Palm Beach County, Florida, United States. The population was 906 at the 2020 census. It is one of the newest municipalities in the South Florida area.  

The Incorporated City of Westlake is located west of Royal Palm Beach and north of Loxahatchee Groves.

History
The city started development after Minto Communities purchased 3,800 acres for $51 million. They later added 200 more acres. It became the 39th city in Palm Beach County in 2016. The city was named in part as a nod to Weston in neighboring Broward County, a similar large-scale community planned by a developer in the 1980s. In November, 2019, Wellington Regional Medical Center purchased 35 acres for $12.3 million to establish a presence in the community.

Demographics

2020 census

As of the 2020 United States census, there were 906 people, 28 households, and 26 families residing in the city.

Public Safety
Police protection is provided by District 18 of the Palm Beach County Sheriff's Office. The city is staffed with 5 Road Patrol Deputies.  In addition, the district receives support from the Traffic Division, K-9, Aviation and Community Policing.  District 18 headquarters is located in the county administrative building in Royal Palm Beach. 

Fire and EMS service is provided by Station 22 of Palm Beach County Fire Rescue. The station contains 4 bays housing an advanced life support Engine, Rescue Ambulance, a 3,000 gallon Water Tender, a Brush Truck and a High-Water Vehicle.  It is home to six uniformed personnel 24 hours a day, 7 days a week.

References

External links 

 Official website
 Minto Group: Westlake

Cities in Palm Beach County, Florida
Cities in Florida
Populated places established in 2016
2016 establishments in Florida